Solomon Hill can refer to:
Solomon Hill (politician) (1756–1807), politician in Upper Canada
Solomon Hill (basketball) (born 1991), American professional basketball player
King Solomon Hill (1897–1949), blues singer and guitarist

See also
 Solomon Hills, a mountain range in Santa Barbara, California